Kamli may refer to:

Kamli (album), a Punjabi music album by Kamal Heer
Kamli (2006 film), a Telugu-language film
Kamli (2022 film), a Pakistani drama film
"Kamli" (song), a Hindi song by Sunidhi Chauhan from the 2013 movie Dhoom 3